Live at Bubba's is a live album by American jazz pianist Ahmad Jamal featuring performances recorded at Bubba's Jazz Restaurant in Fort Lauderdale, FL on May 20, 1980 and released on Who's Who in Jazz in 1981.

Critical reception

The Allmusic review awarded the album 3 stars, with Scott Yanow stating, "Although Ahmad Jamal's recording career was erratic at this period, his live performances were as good as his earlier work. Teamed up with bassist Sabu Adeyola and drummer Payton Crossley, Jamal interprets a diverse program highlighted by 'Waltz for Debbie' and 'I've Never Been In Love Before,' although recording 'People' was probably a mistake."

Track listing

 "Waltz for Debby" (Bill Evans, Gene Lees) – 6:24
 "The Folks Who Live on the Hill" (Oscar Hammerstein II, Jerome Kern) – 5:42
 "People" (Bob Merrill, Jule Styne) – 5:34
 "Baia" (Ary Barroso, Ray Gilbert) – 8:40
 "The Good Life" (Alexandre "Sacha" Distel, Frank Reardon) – 4:41
 "Autumn in New York" (Vernon Duke) – 5:19
 "I've Never Been in Love Before" (Frank Loesser) – 2:50

Personnel
Ahmad Jamal – piano
Sabu Adeyola – bass
Payton Crossley – drums

References 

1981 live albums
Ahmad Jamal live albums